Land of Plenty is a 2004 American drama film directed by Wim Wenders starring Michelle Williams and John Diehl.

The title of the film comes from the song "The Land of Plenty" from the album Ten New Songs, written by Leonard Cohen and Sharon Robinson, which was used in the movie. The film was Gloria Stuart's last screen appearance before her death in 2010.

Plot
The movie presents a view of post-9/11 United States as seen through the eyes of Lana, an American girl who has lived in Africa and the Middle East for years with her missionary parents.  She is returning from a long trip to the West Bank. In Los Angeles, she works at a homeless mission and looks up her only living relative in the US, her late mother's brother, Paul. He is a traumatized Vietnam veteran who drives around filming and spying on Arabs or people with Arab features in the belief that most, if not all are planning terrorist acts on US soil. Lana, in contrast, leans toward anti-war convictions and has been changed by her experiences abroad, so feels outside American culture.

Having first-hand knowledge of the Middle East and Africa, she sees similarities between the slums of Los Angeles and those of the Third World. After she and Paul see the murder of a young Pakistani outside the mission, they take his body to his family. Their road trip offers Paul a different view of Muslim home life. Over the course of the film, Paul and Lana learn more about each other.

Cast

 Michelle Williams as Lana
 John Diehl as Paul
 Shaun Toub as Hassan
 Wendell Pierce as Henry
 Richard Edson as Jimmy
 Burt Young as Sherman
 Yuri Elvin as Officer Elvin
 Jeris Lee Poindexter as Charles
 Rhonda Stubbins White as Dee Dee
 Victoria Thomas as News reporter
 Matthew Kimbrough as News anchor
 Paul West as Policeman
 Jeffrey Vincent Parise as Coroner's assistant
 Christa Lang as Trailer park woman
 Warren Stearns as Mortician
 Bernard White as Youssef
 Gloria Stuart as Old lady

Production
Of the idea for the film, Wim Wenders said it "originated with the fundamentalist Christianity of the Bush era. From the anger that Christianity has been so perverted and used in so a perfidious manner for political interests. As a Christian, I know no other option except to be against war and to have solidarity with the poor". He added, "My film…addresses the underbelly of poverty in the United States, and specifically in Hollywood – not only the entertainment capital of the world, but also an unacknowledged capital of hunger. Poverty was not the main subject of the film, but more of a backdrop to a film that tried to deal with the post-9/11 trauma in the US. The two issues are linked, of course…The problem is that the social net in America has too many holes that people can fall through; they end up abandoned, lost and without hope, which is even more tragic if you think about the country's wealth and its very own ideals of brotherhood and equality."

The film was shot in 16 days using digital cameras.

In the United States, the film was distributed by IFC Films.

Reception
On Rotten Tomatoes, the film has an approval rating of 62% based on 26 reviews, with an average rating of 6.1/10. Metacritic assigned the film a weighted average score of 62 out of 100, based on 10 critics, indicating "generally favorable reviews".

Kevin Thomas of Los Angeles Times said, "Hampered by an ending that overreaches needlessly, the film is nevertheless worthy and unmistakably the effort of an enduringly distinctive and important filmmaker." Leslie Felperin of Variety praised Michelle Williams' performance, saying, "Engaging perfs keep its motor running, with Williams in particular charming and convincing as a politically engaged humanist."

References

External links
 Official website 
 
 
 Land of Plenty at IFC Center

2004 films
2004 drama films
2000s drama road movies
2004 independent films
Films directed by Wim Wenders
Films based on the September 11 attacks
Films about veterans
Films about terrorism
American drama road movies
Films set in Los Angeles
Films shot in Los Angeles
2000s English-language films
2000s American films